Katherine Elaine Hendrix (born December 28, 1970) is an American actress. She is known for her roles in Superstar, Romy and Michele's High School Reunion, the 1995 Get Smart series, the 1998 remake of The Parent Trap, Dynasty, Inspector Gadget 2, and the 2004 documentary film What the Bleep Do We Know!?

Early life and education
Hendrix was born and raised in Oak Ridge, Tennessee. Her father was serving in the Vietnam War at the time of her birth and had little input into her name. Her mother named her Katherine Elaine, but most of her relatives called her by her middle name, and the practice stuck.

Career

Dancing and modelling

In her senior year of high school, Hendrix won a model search and became a professional dancer with the Gary Harrison Dance Company. She soon split her time as a professional model and dancer for such companies as Nike, Levi's, Mattel, and Sun Microsystems, and for a number of hip-hop artists including Whodini, Keith Sweat and MC Hammer.

In 1992, she moved to Los Angeles, California, and, shortly after, was hit by a car while riding her bike, ending her early career as a model and dancer.

Film and television
After recuperating from her accident, Hendrix was cast in the short-lived 1995 Get Smart series. She has also appeared on the television series Joan of Arcadia, Friends, Ellen, Charmed and CSI: Crime Scene Investigation and had a recurring role in Married... with Children, User Friendly (1995) and Lez Be Friends (1997).

Films in which she appeared include Romy and Michele's High School Reunion, the remake of The Parent Trap, Superstar, Inspector Gadget 2, and What the Bleep Do We Know!?. In 2006, she also appeared in an episode of Ghost Whisperer and the movie Coffee Date.  In 2018, Hendrix appeared in Christmas at Pemberley Manor, a Hallmark Channel feature TV movie.

In 2008 Hendrix appeared in two episodes of the single-season ABC Family show The Middleman as Roxy Wasserman, a succubus who works as a fashion designer.  She was seen in a 2008 episode of Criminal Minds ("Normal"). In 2009 Hendrix made an appearance on the ABC show Castle and in the film Rock Slyde.  

In 2011, Hendrix played Felicia in the Tribeca-awarded film Spork.

Hendrix has also appeared as Renee on 90210 in season three in "They're Playing Her Song" and "Holiday Madness". In 2014, she appeared alongside Charlie Sheen for a three-episode story arc as Warden Hartley in the FX sitcom Anger Management. She appears in the web-series Fetching, which is also a nod to her love of animals.
  
She also co-starred as Ava in the FX comedy series Sex & Drugs & Rock & Roll with Denis Leary, Elizabeth Gillies, John Corbett, Bobby Kelly and John Ales.

On September 13, 2018, it was announced that Hendrix would appear as the recurring character Susan Andrews in the Fox series Proven Innocent.

In October 2019, Hendrix was cast as Alexis Carrington Colby for season three of The CW's Dynasty reboot series.

Stage
Hendrix starred as Lisa in the cast of the Off-Broadway play It's Just Sex at the Actors Temple Theatre in Manhattan for its June 2013 to January 2014 run.

In 2016, Hendrix reprised the role of Truvy in Steel Magnolias at the Bucks County Playhouse in New Hope, Pennsylvania. This production was directed by four time Oscar nominee, Marsha Mason, and also starred Patricia Richardson, Lucy DeVito, Jessica Walter and Susan Sullivan.
On June 9, 2016, this production became the highest-grossing show in the history of the Bucks County Playhouse.

Activism efforts
As an avid animal rights activist, Hendrix has been advocating for animals since 2006, when she also adopted a vegan lifestyle. When she's not filming, she travels throughout North America and works with organizations around the globe to educate, demonstrate, speak, protest, build habitats, transport and rescue. In 2012 she founded The Pet Matchmaker, an organization dedicated to celebrating and inspiring the rescue, foster and adoption of homeless pets everywhere. She serves on the board of Stray Rescue of St. Louis as well as the US chapter of No to Dog Meat.

Filmography

Film

Television

Video games

References

External links

 
 
 

1970 births
Living people
American people of Italian descent
American people of Irish descent
American people of Danish descent
20th-century American actresses
21st-century American actresses
Actresses from Tennessee
American female dancers
Dancers from Tennessee
Female models from Tennessee
American film actresses
American television actresses
People from Oak Ridge, Tennessee
People from Morristown, Tennessee